The Dubuque Arboretum and Botanical Gardens  are an arboretum and botanical gardens established in 1980 and located at 3800 Arboretum Drive, Dubuque, Iowa. It is open, without charge, daily (from dawn to dusk) throughout the year. The arboretum is the largest in the United States staffed entirely by volunteers. (About 300 community volunteers help maintain the gardens.)  The Arboretum is a popular spot in the community for outdoor weddings and is also a venue for musical entertainment during the summer months (Music in the Gardens, 6:30p Sunday evenings).

The Gardens include what is claimed to be the largest public hosta garden in the United States (13,000 plants representing over 700 varieties), as well as Annual and Perennial Gardens, several Children's gardens, an English Knot garden and Formal English Garden, Herb Garden, Cactus garden, Iowa State and All American Test Gardens, Japanese garden designed by Hoichi Kurisu, and Rose Gardens. Also notable are the collections of unusual conifers and dwarf conifers.

See also 
Parks in Dubuque, Iowa
List of botanical gardens in the United States
Herb garden

References

External links
Dubuque Arboretum & Botanical Gardens Website

Gardens in Iowa
Arboreta in Iowa
Botanical gardens in Iowa
Culture of Dubuque, Iowa
Parks in Dubuque, Iowa
Japanese gardens in the United States
1980 establishments in Iowa
Cactus gardens